Valeria Fedeli (born 29 July 1949) is an Italian politician, former Minister of Education, Universities and Research in the Gentiloni Cabinet.

Biography 
Fedeli began her career in the 1970s as a kindergarten teacher in Milan, and then went to Rome in order to work at the national secretariat of the Italian General Confederation of Labour. In 1994 she joined the National Directorate of syndicate.

In 2013, during the Silvio Berlusconi's Rubygate Scandal, Fedeli was among the founders of the feminist committee Se non ora, quando? (If not now, when?) to denounce the "degrading model flaunted by one of the highest offices of the State, damaging the dignity of women and institutions".

She is married to former Democratic Party senator Achille Passoni.

Political career 
In 2012, she left the syndicate in order to candidate for the Senate with the Democratic Party at the 2013 elections. Once elected, she became Vice-president of the Senate and, while the President of the Senate Pietro Grasso held the function of acting President of Italy, she presided over the work of the Senate as vicar Vice-president: in this role, she helped the President of the Chamber of Deputies Laura Boldrini in conducting the work of Parliament in joint session for the election of the President of the Italian Republic, which leads to the presidency Sergio Mattarella.

On 12 December 2016, after the resignation of the Renzi Cabinet, Paolo Gentiloni became the new Prime Minister, and Fedeli became Minister of Education, Universities and Research.

She was re-elected as Senator at the 2018 elections and was the Democratic Party candidate for the role of President of the Senate: eventually the elected president was Maria Elisabetta Alberti Casellati from Forza Italia.

References

External links 
Files about her parliamentary activities (in Italian): XVII, XVIII legislature

Living people
1949 births
Democratic Party (Italy) politicians
Government ministers of Italy
Education ministers of Italy
Women government ministers of Italy
21st-century Italian politicians
Italian trade unionists
21st-century Italian women politicians
Vice presidents of the Senate (Italy)
20th-century Italian women
Women members of the Senate of the Republic (Italy)